CD-40 or No. 40 was a Type D escort ship of the Imperial Japanese Navy during World War II and later the Republic of China Navy.

History
She was laid down on 20 March 1944 at the Osaka shipyard of Fujinagata Shipbuilding for the benefit of the Imperial Japanese Navy and launched on 15 November 1944. On 22 December 1944, she was completed and commissioned. On 1 February 1945, she was assigned to the First Escort Fleet and then reassigned on 10 July 1945 to the 105th Escort Squadron. On 15 August 1945, Japan announced their unconditional surrender. On 30 November 1945, she was struck from the Navy List. On 1 December 1945, she was assigned to the Allied Occupation Force where she served as a minesweeper. 

On 29 August 1947, she was ceded to the Republic of China as a war reparation and renamed Cheng An / Chan An (成安).

References

Bibliography

1944 ships
Type D escort ships
Ships built by Fujinagata Shipyards
Ships of the Republic of China Navy